Senate elections were held in Turkey on 12 October 1975. In this election 54 members of the Senate were elected; 50 members for one-third of the Senate and four vacant seats. The election system was the majority system and Justice Party gained more seats than Republican People's Party which was the leading party in terms of votes.

Results

References

Turkey
Turkey
Senate
Senate elections in Turkey